Malaxis wendtii, the Wendt's adder's-mouth orchid, is a North American species of orchids native to northern Mexico (Querétaro, Nuevo León, Coahuila) and the US State of Texas.

Malaxis wendtii is an herb up to 45 cm (18 inches) tall. It generally has only one leaf, and above it a long vertical array of small purple flowers.

References

External links 
 photo of herbarium specimen at Missouri Botanical Garden, collected in Nuevo León in 1996

wendtii
Flora of Texas
Plants described in 1993
Orchids of Mexico